The Journal of American History is the official academic journal of the Organization of American Historians. It covers the field of American history and was established in 1914 as the Mississippi Valley Historical Review, the official journal of the Mississippi Valley Historical Association.  After the publication of its fiftieth volume, the recognition of a shift in the direction of the membership and its scholarship led to the name change in 1964.

The journal is headquartered in Bloomington, Indiana, where it has close ties to the History Department at Indiana University. It is published quarterly, in March, June, September, and December.

List of editors

Proceedings of the Mississippi Valley Historical Association 
 Benjamin F. Shambaugh (1908–14)

Mississippi Valley Historical Review 
 Clarence W. Alvord (1914–23)
 Lester B. Shippee (1923–24)
 Milo M. Quaife (1924–30)
 Arthur Charles Cole (1930–41)
 Louis Pelzer (1941–46)
 Wendell H. Stephenson (1946–53)
 William C. Binkley (1953–63)
 Oscar O. Winther (1963–64)

Journal of American History 
 Oscar O. Winther (1964–66)
 Martin Ridge (1966–78)
 Lewis Perry (1978–84)
 Paul Lucas (1984–85) 
 David Thelen (1985–99)
 Joanne Meyerowitz (1999–2004)
 David Nord (2004–05)
 Edward T. Linenthal (2005–2016)
 Benjamin H. Irvin (2017—present)

Further reading

External links 
 

History of the United States journals
Quarterly journals
Oxford University Press academic journals
Publications established in 1914
English-language journals
Academic journals associated with learned and professional societies
Indiana University